Dierrias J. Humphries Jr. (born December 28, 1993) is an American football offensive tackle for the Arizona Cardinals of the National Football League (NFL).  He played college football at Florida.  Humphries won the 2011 Anthony Muñoz Award, awarded to the best lineman in high school football.

High school career 
A native of Charlotte, North Carolina, Humphries attended Mallard Creek High School, where he was a three-sport athlete in football, basketball, and track.  He was an All-American offensive lineman, clearing the way for 2,000-yard rusher Jela Duncan, and helping protect quarterback Marquise Williams.  Humphries started from his freshman season and did not allow a sack over the final three years of his prep career.  In 2011, Humphries helped Mallard Creek to a 13–1 record and berth in the NCHSAA Class 4AA State Semifinals, where they were upset 41–27 by Greensboro (NC) Page.  In track & field, Humphries competed in the shot put (top-throw of 48 ft 9 in, or 15.25 m) and the discus (105 ft 3 in, or 32.15 m).

Regarded as a five-star recruit by Rivals.com, Humphries was ranked as the No. 1 offensive tackle prospect of his class, ahead of No. 2 prospect Zach Banner. Rivals compared him to D'Brickashaw Ferguson.  Recruited by virtually every Division I program in the country, Humphries chose Florida over offers from Alabama, Georgia, and North Carolina, among others.

College career 
Humphries enrolled in January 2012 to participate in spring practice.  As a true freshman, he appeared in all 12 games, starting three (South Carolina, Missouri, and Louisiana–Lafayette).  He graded out at 80 percent or better six times, including 100 percent against Texas A&M and Tennessee.  Humphries was named First-team Offense SEC Coaches' All-Freshman (OL) and Sporting News Freshman All-America.  He played the first seven games of his sophomore season in 2013, before suffering a season-ending injury.  As a junior in 2014, he played in 10 games, missing two due to injury.

Professional career

After his junior season, Humphries entered the 2015 NFL Draft, and was selected with the 24th overall pick by the Arizona Cardinals. He was the highest selected Florida offensive lineman since Mike Pouncey in 2011.

On June 1, 2015, the Cardinals signed Humphries to a four-year, $8.91 million rookie contract with $7.26 million guaranteed and a signing bonus of $4.74 million.

Throughout his rookie training camp and in the preseason, Humphries displayed revolting play in practice and preseason. Head coach Bruce Arians nicknamed him "knee-deep", explaining that you need to keep "A knee in his ass every day" to keep him motivated.

He started his rookie season as the Cardinals' third right tackle on their depth chart, behind veterans Earl Watford and Bobby Massie. During his rookie season, he was inactive for all 16 regular season games and both postseason contests. He was the only first round draft pick in 2015 to be inactive the entire season.

To begin his second season with the Cardinals, Humphries was named the starting right tackle to begin the regular season. He had his professional debut and first career start in the Arizona Cardinals' season opening 21-23 loss to the New England Patriots. On November 27, 2016, he made his first career start at left tackle in a 19-38 loss to the Atlanta Falcons. Starting left tackle Jared Veldheer suffered a torn triceps a few games prior and Humphries replaced the struggling John Wetzel who was in place of Veldheer. On December 11, 2016, Humphries suffered a concussion during the first half of a Week 14 23-26 loss to the Miami Dolphins.

Humphries entered the 2017 season as the Cardinals' starting left tackle. He suffered an MCL sprain in Week 1 and missed the next four games. He returned in Week 6 and started the next four games at left tackle. However in Week 10 on Thursday Night Football, Humphries left the game with a knee injury. He was later diagnosed with a dislocated knee cap and an MCL injury and was ruled out for the season.

On April 24, 2018, the Cardinals picked up the fifth-year option on Humphries' contract. He started the first nine games at left tackle before suffering a knee injury in Week 10. He missed the next three games before being placed on injured reserve on December 5, 2018.

On February 17, 2020, Humphries signed a three-year, $45 million contract extension with the Cardinals through the 2022 season.

On August 2, 2022, Humphries signed a three-year, $66.6 million contract extension with the Cardinals through the 2025 season.

On November 26, 2022, Humphries was placed on injured reserve with a back injury.

Personal life 
His father, also named D. J. Humphries, played college football and basketball at Presbyterian College, as well as in the Arena Football League.

References

External links 
Florida Gators bio
Arizona Cardinals bio

1993 births
Living people
African-American players of American football
American football offensive tackles
Arizona Cardinals players
Florida Gators football players
Players of American football from Charlotte, North Carolina
21st-century African-American sportspeople